The locality of Barinia is situated in South Australia in the Mid North region, approximately 10 km north of Clare. It was a railway siding on the Spalding railway line, which closed in 1984. In November 2009 it became the northern terminus of the Riesling Trail, which utilises the route of the former railway.

Governance
Barinia is governed at the local level by the District Council of Clare and Gilbert Valleys, located within the state electoral district of Frome and the federal electoral division of Spence.

See also
 Clare Valley

References

External links
Barinia at Google Maps

Mid North (South Australia)